The Krupa river is a left tributary of the river Neretva and the main water current of Hutovo Blato, which leads the waters from Gornje Blato and Svitavsko Lake into the Neretva river near Dračevo. The length of Krupa is 9 km with an average depth of 5 meters. The Krupa does not have an actual source, but is actually an extension of Deransko Lake. Also, the Krupa is a unique river in Europe, because the river flows both ways. It flows normally from the source to the mouth and from the mouth to the source. This happens when, due to high water levels and large quantities of water, the Neretva pushes the Krupa river in the opposite direction.

See also 
 Bregava
 Hutovo Blato

References

External links
 
 Krupa river & Hutovo Blato – NAP – Network of Adriatic Parks
 Hutovo Blato Nature Park
 Commission for Preservation of National Monuments of Bosnia and Herzegovina
NGO for Environment protection ZELENI-NERETVA Konjic
WWF Panda – Living Neretva
REC Transboundary Cooperation Through the Management of Shared Natural Resources
INWEB Internationally Shared Surface Water Bodies in the Balkan Region
Narenta
Wine route Herzegovina
Čapljina municipality
Neretva.org Open Project

Rivers of Bosnia and Herzegovina
Landforms of the Federation of Bosnia and Herzegovina
Hutovo Blato
Lower Horizons Hydroelectric Power Stations System
Trebišnjica